ʿUmayr ibn Wahb was one of the Companions of the Prophet, and one of the enemies of the Muslim at that time before he converted to Islam. He converted to Islam after the Battle of Badr.

See also
Wahb ibn Umayr, children
Family tree of Umayr ibn Wahb

External links
A2Youth - About Islam - Articles - Stories of The Sahabah
A section from Companions of the Prophet, by Abdul Wahid Hamid

References

Companions of the Prophet
Opponents of Muhammad